Under the Whyte notation for the classification of steam locomotives by wheel arrangement, a  is a locomotive with one pair of unpowered leading wheels, followed by two sets of three pairs of powered driving wheels and one pair of trailing wheels. The wheel arrangement was principally used on Mallet-type articulated locomotives, although some tank locomotive examples were also built. A Garratt type locomotive with the same wheel arrangement is designated .

Under the UIC classification the wheel arrangement is referred to as (1'C)C1' for Mallet locomotives.

Overview
The 2-6-6-2 wheel arrangement was most often used for articulated compound steam Mallet locomotives. In a compound Mallet, the rear set of coupled wheels are driven by the smaller high pressure cylinders, from which spent steam is then fed to the larger low pressure cylinders that drive the front set of coupled wheels.

This type of locomotive was commonly used in North America on logging railroads. The 2-6-6-2 wheel arrangement was also used in South Africa and the Soviet Union.

Usage

Serbia

The Serbian government used a Mallet articulated compound locomotive for freight service on  narrow gauge. It was built for the Serbian government by the American Locomotive Company (ALCO).

South Africa
 In March 1910, the Central South African Railways (CSAR) placed a single experimental Mallet articulated compound steam locomotive in service. It had Walschaerts valve gear and used saturated steam. In 1912, when it was assimilated into the SAR, it was designated Class MD.

 In 1911, the CSAR placed nine compound Mallets in service. Also built by ALCO and with Walschaerts valve gear, they were very similar to the experimental Class MD, but they were equipped with Schmidt superheaters. In 1912, when they were assimilated into the SAR, they were classified as Class MF. Five more that were delivered in November 1911 were taken directly onto the SAR roster. In 1923 and 1925, six of them were converted to simple expansion (simplex) locomotives.

 A single experimental compound locomotive was included with the CSAR's order for Class MF Mallets from ALCO. It was similar to the others, also with Walschaerts valve gear, but it used saturated steam and had a mechanical stoker, the first South African locomotive to be so equipped. The coupled wheels on the leading engine unit were of a  larger diameter than those of the trailing engine unit. It was the only South African articulated locomotive to have driving wheels of different diameters and, in theory, this configuration was to result in improved acceleration, with the rear engine unit providing the traction. It was also believed that the difference in frequency between the front and rear cylinder exhaust beats would result in a more even pressure in the receiver pipe and therefore improved steam flow. In 1912, when it was assimilated into the SAR, it was designated Class MG.

 During 1911, the CSAR ordered an experimental simple expansion Mallet from the North British Locomotive Company (NBL). Compared to other South African Mallets, this locomotive was unique, being arranged as a simplex locomotive with four high pressure cylinders instead of the more usual compound expansion arrangement. The locomotive was intended for test purposes on branchlines with light  rail. It had Walschaerts valve gear, a plate frame and was equipped with a Schmidt superheater. By the time it was delivered in January 1912, the CSAR had already become part of the newly established SAR, who designated it the sole Class ME.
In 1915, the SAR placed five Class MH compound Mallets in service, designed in detail in the locomotive drawing office in Pretoria under the direction of D.A. Hendrie, Chief Mechanical Engineer (CME) of the SAR from 1910 to 1922. They were superheated and had Walschaerts valve gear. The locomotives were built by NBL and erected in the Salvokop shops in Pretoria. At the time of their introduction, the Class MH was the largest and most powerful locomotive in the world on Cape gauge, with a full working order weight of .i.0/}+"P:

Soviet Union
The wheel arrangement also appeared in Soviet Russia as a  locomotive, the P34, built by Kolomna Locomotive Works. It was a modern but compact Mallet of which only one was built.

United States

D&RGW purchased these for helper service in 1910 (Soldier Summit and Tennessee Pass), and later added the two N&W locomotives to "beef up helper service" once again. All were retired between 1947 and 1952.

Chesapeake and Ohio 1309 is now operating on Western Maryland Scenic Railroad after a restoration completed in December 2020, replacing its companion, 734, which is undergoing evaluation for a possible return to service. It operated on its first excursion in December 2021.

References